"The Tsuranga Conundrum" is the fifth episode of the eleventh series of the British science fiction television programme Doctor Who. It was written by showrunner and executive producer Chris Chibnall, directed by Jennifer Perrott, and first broadcast on BBC One on 4 November 2018.

In the episode, alien time traveller the Doctor (Jodie Whittaker) and her companions – Graham O'Brien (Bradley Walsh), Ryan Sinclair (Tosin Cole), and Yasmin Khan (Mandip Gill) – are brought aboard a medical ship to recover from injuries they recently endured, only to find themselves dealing with a dangerous alien creature that threatens the ship and those being transported by it. The episode guest stars Brett Goldstein, Lois Chimimba, Suzanne Packer, Ben Bailey-Smith, David Shields, and Jack Shalloo. The episode was watched by 7.76 million viewers, and was met with mixed reviews from critics.

Plot 

While scavenging on an alien junkyard planet, the Thirteenth Doctor, and her companions, Graham, Yasmin, and Ryan are caught in a sonic mine's detonation. They wake aboard the Tsuranga, an automated ship travelling to a medical space-station. Exploring the ship, the Doctor meets some of the patients being transported – Eve Cicero, a renowned general; her brother Durkas; Eve's synth robot partner Ronan; and Yoss, a pregnant man. After gaining access to the ship's systems, the Doctor, alongside head nurse Astos, notice something heading for the ship. They realise it is an alien entity, which gains access to the ship and starts damaging its escape pods. Astos becomes trapped in one that he is inspecting, and dies when the pod is jettisoned into space and explodes.

Helped by Mabli, Astos' colleague, the Doctor learns that the entity is a Pting, a creature that eats non-organic material and is classed as highly dangerous. Learning that the ship will be remotely detonated if the space-station detects the creature aboard, the Doctor works to prevent this happening. While Yasmin and Ronan defend the ship's power source from the Pting, Ryan and Graham offer to help Mabli with Yoss as he enters labour. Meanwhile, the Doctor, Eve, and Durkas focus on gaining manual control of the ship. During this time, the Doctor learns that Eve has a critical heart condition that could kill her if she interfaces with the ship. Despite this, Eve sacrifices herself to protect everyone aboard the ship by navigating it through an asteroid field, before Durkas assumes control in her place.

The Doctor suddenly deduces that the Pting was attracted to the ship looking for energy sources, its true food source. With this knowledge, she returns to the ship's power source, realizing it has a built-in failsafe bomb. Removing it, she primes the device and feeds it to the Pting, giving it ample energy before she jettisons it into space. Durkas safely brings the Tsuranga to the space-station, while Ryan and Graham help Yoss give birth successfully. Before leaving to recover her TARDIS with the others, the Doctor joins Mabli and the patients in honouring Eve for her courage.

Production

Development 
The Pting creature was created and named by writer Tim Price, who worked in the story room early in the series' development. Chibnall told Marcus Hearn of Doctor Who Magazine that the team loved the "brilliant and unusual name for the alien."

Casting 
After the premiere episode, "The Woman Who Fell to Earth", was broadcast, it was announced that Brett Goldstein, Lois Chimimba, and Ben Bailey-Smith would be among a number of guest actors that would appear in the series. They play Astos, Mabli and Durkas Cicero respectively. "The Tsuranga Conundrum" also guest stars Suzanne Packer as Eve Cicero, David Shields as Ronan, and Jack Shalloo as Yoss Inkl.

Filming 
To help with filming the episode, production staff invited Australian director Jennifer Perrott to come over and oversee the directing of scenes for "The Tsuranga Conundrum".

Broadcast and reception

Ratings 
"The Tsuranga Conundrum" was watched by 6.12 million viewers overnight, a share of 29.5% of the total TV audience, making it the second-highest overnight viewership for the night and the sixth-highest overnight viewership for the week on overnights across all channels. The episode had an Audience Appreciation Index score of 79. It received an official total of 7.76 million viewers across all UK channels, making it the sixth most watched programme of the week.

Critical reception 
The episode was met with mixed reviews. Rotten Tomatoes gave the episode an approval rating of 79%, based on 24 critics, and an average score of 6.1/10, the critical consensus stating: "True colors rise to the surface in 'The Tsuranga Conundrum' as the team tackles difficult emotions, new found confidence, and impending mayhem."

References

External links 

 
 
 

Television episodes set in the future
Fiction set in the 7th millennium or beyond
2018 British television episodes
Television episodes written by Chris Chibnall
Television episodes set in hospitals
Television episodes set in outer space
Thirteenth Doctor episodes